Gert Christian Persson (born 6 May 1957 in Önnestad) is a Swedish equestrian. He competed in two events at the 1984 Summer Olympics.

References

External links
 Christian Persson (and here) at FEI
 
 
 

1957 births
Living people
Swedish male equestrians
Olympic equestrians of Sweden
Equestrians at the 1984 Summer Olympics
People from Kristianstad Municipality
Sportspeople from Skåne County
20th-century Swedish people